Pablo Rabiella y Díez de Aux (died 1719) was a Spanish painter of battle-pieces and portraits.

Díez de Aux lived at Zaragosa at the start of the 18th century.  His brother Pablo Félix was also a painter.

Díez de Aux painted for the chapels of St. Marco and Santiago, and one in the Cathedral de la Seu at Zaragoza, representing the Battle of Clavijo (1696).  His other paintings included the Martyr of Santiago and Saints Peter and Paul which is now at the Zaragoza Museum.

He died in Zaragoza, age unknown.

References
   
MORALES Y MARÍN, José Luis, La pintura aragonesa en el siglo XVII (Aragonese Painting in the 17th Century), Zaragoza, Guara, 1980, p. 103-104.

External links
Pablo Rabiella y Díez de Aux at the «Los Rabiella» in the online Gran Enciclopedia Aragonesa 

People from Zaragoza
Spanish Baroque painters
18th-century Spanish painters
18th-century Spanish male artists
Spanish male painters
1719 deaths